Anna Ellinor Hasselborg (born 5 May 1989) is a Swedish curler who is the 2018 Olympic Champion in women's curling and a former World Junior Champion skip. In November 2019, she became the first curler in history to reign as the simultaneous holder of the European Curling Championship gold medal, the World Mixed Doubles Curling Championship gold medal, and the Olympic gold medal.

Career

Junior career
Hasselborg made her international debut at the 2008 European Mixed Curling Championship, playing third for Niklas Edin, winning a bronze medal. In 2009, Hasselborg played in her first World Juniors, skipping Sweden to a 6th-place finish. At the 2010 World Junior Curling Championships, Hasselborg upset the Canadian rink skipped by Rachel Homan in the final by a score of 8–3.

Hasselborg skipped Sweden at the 2013 Winter Universiade, leading her country to a 5th-place finish.

Women's career
Hasselborg graduated from the junior level in 2010, beginning to skip a team on the World Curling Tour. In her first season after juniors, her team won the 2011 Glynhill Ladies International.

Hasselborg skipped the Swedish national women's team at the 2014 European Curling Championships, leading her team to a 5th-place finish. This would be her first European Championship appearance. 

In 2015, Hasselborg's current team of Sara McManus, Agnes Knochenhauer, and Sofia Mabergs came together. The following season, the team won two Tour titles, the 2016 Oakville OCT Fall Classic and the 2016 Stockholm Ladies Curling Cup. That season, the team also represented Sweden at the 2016 European Curling Championships, where they won a silver medal, losing to Russia's Victoria Moiseeva in the final. Later in the season, they represented Sweden at the 2017 World Women's Curling Championship, where they placed fourth.

Hasselborg's rink was selected to represent Sweden at the 2018 Winter Olympics. In the lead-up to the games, the team took home another silver medal at the European Championships, losing in the final of the 2017 European Curling Championships to Eve Muirhead's team from Scotland. A few months later, at the Olympics, Hasselborg led her team to a 7-2 round robin record, in second place behind the host Korean "garlic girls" team, skipped by Kim Eun-jung. In the playoffs, Hasselborg knocked off the Muirhead-led British rink in the semifinal before beating South Korea in the final to win the gold medal. A month later, Hasselborg skipped the Swedish national women's team at the 2018 World Women's Curling Championship, falling to the Canadian team in an extra end in the final to take home the silver medal.

Hasselborg won her first Grand Slam in the lone women's Elite 10 in 2018, going undefeated through the tournament and defeating Silvana Tirinzoni in the final. A few weeks later, she won her second career Stockholm Ladies Cup. Then, at the 2018 Masters, Hasselborg won her second straight slam, defeating Rachel Homan in the final. The following month, Hasselborg and her team took home the gold medal at the 2018 European Curling Championships, her first gold medal at the Euros, defeating Switzerland's Tirinzoni rink in the final. Hasselborg lost the world final once again at the 2019 World Women's Curling Championship, this time losing to Tirinzoni. She was, however, victorious at the 2019 World Mixed Doubles Curling Championship with partner Oskar Eriksson. The team secured the number one spot in the playoffs en route to defeating the Canadian pair of Jocelyn Peterman and Brett Gallant in the final.

Team Hasselborg began the 2019–20 season at the Stu Sells Oakville Tankard, where they defeated Anna Sidorova in the final. They missed the playoffs at the 2019 AMJ Campbell Shorty Jenkins Classic after going 2–2 in the round robin. They defended their title at the 2019 European Curling Championships. Down 4–3 in the tenth end of the final to Scotland's Eve Muirhead, Hasselborg made a runback on her final stone to score two and win. In Grand Slam play, Team Hasselborg was the most dominant team on the women's side, winning them the 2019–20 Pinty's Cup. They lost in the semifinal of the Masters to Tracy Fleury before winning the next three Slams, the Tour Challenge, National and the Canadian Open. The team was set to represent Sweden at the 2020 World Women's Curling Championship before the event got cancelled due to the COVID-19 pandemic. The Canadian Open would be their last event of the season as both the Players' Championship and the Champions Cup Grand Slam events were also cancelled due to the pandemic.

Hasselborg and her team won the first event of the abbreviated 2020–21 season, defeating Raphaela Keiser in the final of the 2020 Women's Masters Basel. Next, they played Team Wranå in the Sweden National Challenge in December 2020, where they lost 17–12. A "curling bubble" was set up in Calgary, Canada in the spring, which hosted several events, including the 2021 World Women's Curling Championship and two slams. Team Hasselborg competed in both the 2021 Champions Cup and the 2021 Players' Championship, finishing 0–4 at the Champions Cup and reaching the semifinals of the Players'. The following week, the team represented Sweden at the Worlds. Through the round robin, Hasselborg led her team to a 10–3 record, qualifying them for the playoffs. After defeating Canada's Kerri Einarson 8–3 in the qualification round, they lost a narrow 8–7 semifinal against the RCF, skipped by Alina Kovaleva. This put them in the bronze medal game, which they lost 9–5 to the Tabitha Peterson rink of the United States. On 4 June 2021 Hasselborg and her teammates were selected as the Olympic Team for the 2022 Winter Olympics.

Team Hasselborg began the 2021–22 season competing in the men's Baden Masters tour event, where they missed the playoffs. At the 2021 Women's Masters Basel, the team made it all the way to the final, where they lost to Denmark's Madeleine Dupont. Next, they played in the 2021 Masters Grand Slam event, where they again missed the playoffs. They were able to rebound at the 2021 National, however, claiming the title with a 9–6 victory over Tracy Fleury in the final game. In November, Team Hasselborg again represented Sweden at the 2021 European Curling Championships where they finished third in the round robin with a 7–2 record. They then defeated Russia's Alina Kovaleva in the semifinal before dropping the final to Scotland's Eve Muirhead, settling for silver. The next event for Team Hasselborg was the 2022 Winter Olympics, where they attempted to defend their gold medal from 2018. The team placed second after the round robin preliminary stage with a 7–2 record. This earned them a semifinal berth where they would face Great Britain's Muirhead rink. In one of the highest-scoring games in curling, Muirhead scored a single point in the extra end to win 12–11, ending Hasselborg's chances of repeating as Olympic gold medallists. They did still earn a medal from the Games, however, as they were able to beat Switzerland's Silvana Tirinzoni rink 9–7 in the bronze medal game. Next for the Swedish rink was the 2022 World Women's Curling Championship, where they finished fourth in the round robin with a 9–3 record. They then defeated the United States Cory Christensen in the qualification game before dropping the semifinal and bronze medal games to Switzerland and Canada, respectively, placing fourth. Team Hasselborg wrapped up their season at the final two Slams of the season, the 2022 Players' Championship and the 2022 Champions Cup. At the Players', the team began with two straight losses before rattling off six straight victories to claim the event title, despite Hasselborg and third Sara McManus feeling ill in the final game due to food poisoning. With the victory, Team Hasselborg became the first women's team to win a career Grand Slam (winning all four 'majors'). At the Champions Cup, they went undefeated up until the semifinal round where they were eliminated by Kerri Einarson.

Personal life
Hasselborg is married to Mathias Hasselborg (né Eriksson), and has one daughter. She comes from a family of curlers including father Mikael, uncle Stefan, brother Marcus and cousin Mio. She lives in Solna, a suburb of Stockholm.

Grand Slam record
Hasselborg and her rink became the first women's team to win a career "Grand Slam" (winning all four 'majors') when she won the 2022 Players' Championship.

Former events

Teams

References

External links

Swedish female curlers
Living people
1989 births
Sportspeople from Stockholm
Continental Cup of Curling participants
Curlers at the 2018 Winter Olympics
Curlers at the 2022 Winter Olympics
Olympic curlers of Sweden
Olympic gold medalists for Sweden
Olympic bronze medalists for Sweden
Medalists at the 2018 Winter Olympics
Medalists at the 2022 Winter Olympics
Olympic medalists in curling
European curling champions
Swedish curling champions
World mixed doubles curling champions
People from Solna Municipality
21st-century Swedish women